Carlyle Township is one of twelve townships in Allen County, Kansas, United States. As of the 2010 census, its population was 285.

Geography
According to the USGS, it contains two cemeteries: Old Carlyle and Pioneer.

Boyers Lake is within this township. The streams of Carlyle Creek, Cottonwood Creek and Little Deer Creek run through this township.

References
 USGS Geographic Names Information System (GNIS)

External links
 US-Counties.com
 City-Data.com

Townships in Allen County, Kansas
Townships in Kansas